Arief Catur Pamungkas (born 25 July 1999) is an Indonesian professional footballer who plays as an full-back for Liga 1 club Persebaya Surabaya.

Club career

Persebaya Surabaya
He was signed for Persebaya Surabaya and played in Liga 1 in 2022-2023 season. Arief made his league debut on 25 July 2022 in a match against Persikabo 1973 at the Pakansari Stadium, Cibinong.

Career statistics

Club

Notes

Honours

Club 
Persebaya Surabaya U20
 Elite Pro Academy U-20: 2019
Persikab Bandung
 Liga 3 West Java: 2021

References

External links
 Arief Catur at Soccerway
 Arief Catur at Liga Indonesia

1999 births
Living people
People from Mojokerto
Sportspeople from East Java
Indonesian footballers
Persikab Bandung players
Persebaya Surabaya players
Liga 1 (Indonesia) players
Association football defenders